Adolf Šimperský (5 August 1909 in Břevnov – 15 February 1964) is a former Czechoslovak football player who played mostly for SK Slavia Praha.

He played ten matches for the Czechoslovakia national team and was a participant at the 1934 FIFA World Cup.

External links
 
 

1909 births
1964 deaths
Czechoslovak footballers
1934 FIFA World Cup players
SK Slavia Prague players
FC Baník Ostrava players
Czechoslovakia international footballers
Association football midfielders
Footballers from Prague